Severino Montano (January 3, 1915 – December 12, 1980) was a playwright, director, actor and theater organizer with an output of one novel, 150 poems and 50 plays in his 65-year lifetime. Through the foundation of the Arena Theater, Montano institutionalized “legitimate theater” in the Philippines. Considered one of the Titans of Philippine Theater, he also have lifetime achievement award as part of National Artist of the Philippines.

Life and career
Montano was born in Laoag, Ilocos Norte. Academically, he started his tutelage under a British mentor, Marie Leslie Prising, when he was thirteen. He studied at the University of the Philippines. She took Montano under her wing and endowed him with Western literature, the theater and Shakespeare. He was part of the UP Stage when he studied in the University of the Philippines. Then a scholarship took him to the famous "English 47" or "Workshop 47" playwriting workshops of George Pierce Baker at Yale University and guided by Broadway names and international personalities like Komissarjevsky of the famous Moscow Art Theater. He was conferred a Master of Fine Arts degree in playwriting and production by Yale University.

In 1946, he went to London to become a student of economist Harold Laski of the London School of Economics. Not long after, he was offered a teaching job at the American University in Washington, D.C. There, he finished his M.A. in Economic and Ph.D. in management and public administration, at the same time leading a playwriting-drama program as professor, playwright and play director. In 1950, 1952, 1962 and 1963, The Rockefeller Foundation extended him a world travel grant to visit cultural and art centers in 98 cities in Europe, the Middle East, South Asia, India, China and Japan.

When he returned to the Philippines, he already had 16 major plays to his credit. As Dean of Instruction of the Philippine Normal College, Montano organized the Arena Theater “to bring drama to the masses”. He used his own money, about a thousand pesos, to start the Arena Theater, a theater-in-the-round. Due to the PNC being unable to fund the theater, Montano volunteered his services “to plan for a self-financing national drama program that would serve the grass-roots, the barrios of the Philippines”.

In 1953, the theater opened with three one-act plays and broke all records of all performances in Philippine theater history. The roving troupe took theater to near and far-flung barrios in 47 provinces across the country. Four of his plays became tour staples: the full-length The Love of Leonor Rivera and three one-act plays, Parting at Calamba, The Ladies and the Senador and Sabina. The Arena Theater also began a graduate program for the training of playwrights, directors, technicians, actors and designers. The program was also extended to include a four-year undergraduate curriculum.

He trained and directed a new generation of dramatist including Rolando S. Tinio and Behn Cervantes. The Arena Theater Playwriting Contest also led to the discovery of Wilfrido Nolledo, Jesus T. Peralta and Estrella Alfon.

His awards include the Kalinangan Award from the city of Manila (1968), the Presidential Award for Merit in Drama and Theater (1961), the Citizen's Committee for Mass Media Award (1967 and 1968), the Pamulinawen Award (1981), and the National Artist Award (2001). The last two awards were given posthumously.

His published works include The Love of Leonor Rivera (poetic tragedy in two-parts), My Morning Star (poetic historical tragedy in three-parts), But Not My Sons Any Longer (poetic tragedy in two-parts), Gabriela Silang (poetic historical tragedy in three-parts), The Merry Wives of Manila (comedy of manners in three-parts), Sabina (tragedy), The Ladies and the Senador (satirical comedy) and Parting at Calamba (historical drama).

He died on December 12, 1980, at the age of 65.

Aims of the Arena Theater
"What we want to do at the Arena Theater is not to become professionals overnight, but to develop a professional approach, and grow into professionalism with time, experience and hard work as our legitimate passport towards that goal. In the meanwhile, we want to develop technicians and train playwrights, actors, directors, costume designers, lighting technicians and business-minded artists who will know how to get into production profitably.

At the Arena we also realize the importance that drama plays in personal adjustments. We understand the psychological value of role playing, and the tremendous influence dramatic art may have in developing the character of the individual and his relationship to a social group. We aim to reach other areas of the country through our student teachers who comes from all over the Philippines to work with us."

See also
Jose Y. Dalisay Jr.
Wilfrido Ma. Guerrero
Rene Villanueva
Sumalee Montano

External links
https://web.archive.org/web/20070928051754/http://www.ncca.gov.ph/about_cultarts/cultprofile/natarts/theater/montano.php
https://web.archive.org/web/20080116151805/http://www.ncca.gov.ph/about_cultarts/articles.php?artcl_Id=279
http://www.asianjournal.com/?c=53&a=9990&sid=528116fed9897b859a13a02e083227eb

1915 births
1980 deaths
People from Laoag
Ilocano people
Filipino dramatists and playwrights
National Artists of the Philippines
Yale University alumni
Alumni of the London School of Economics
20th-century dramatists and playwrights
University of the Philippines alumni
Filipino male stage actors
American University alumni